Dogofry is a rural commune in the Cercle of Nara in the Koulikoro Region of south-western Mali.  The commune contains 28 villages and in the 2009 census had a population of 34,336. The main village is Ballé.

External links
.

References

Communes of Koulikoro Region